A gurdwara (sometimes written as gurudwara) (Gurmukhi: ਗੁਰਦੁਆਰਾ guradu'ārā, meaning "Door to the Guru") is a place of assembly and worship for Sikhs. Sikhs also refer to gurdwaras as Gurdwara Sahib. People from all faiths are welcomed in gurdwaras. Any congregant (sometimes with specialized training, in which case they can be known by the term granthi) may recite, sing, and explain the verses from the Guru Granth Sahib, in the presence of the rest of the congregation.

All gurdwaras have a  hall, where people can eat free lacto-vegetarian food served by volunteers at the gurdwara. They may also have a medical facility room, library, nursery, classroom, meeting rooms, playground, sports ground, a gift shop, and finally a repair shop. A gurdwara can be identified from a distance by tall flagpoles bearing the Nishan Sahib, the Sikh flag.

The best-known gurdwaras are in the Darbar Sahib complex in Amritsar, Punjab, including Darbar Sahib, the spiritual center of the Sikhs and Akal Takht, the political center of the Sikhs.

History

The first gurdwara was built in Kartarpur, on the banks of Ravi River in the Punjab region by the first Sikh guru, Guru Nanak Dev in the year 1521. It now lies in the Narowal District of west Punjab (Pakistan). During the time of Guru Nanak, Sikh places of worship were known as Dharamsals (meaning ‘abode of righteousness’) where kirtan was conducted by the early Sikh congregation.

As the Sikh population continued to grow, Guru Hargobind, the sixth Sikh guru, introduced the word gurdwara.

Thereafter, all Sikh places of worship came to be known as gurdwaras.

The use of 'sahib', as sometimes appended in the term Gurdwara Sahib, derives from a loanword of Arabic origin, meaning "companion" or "friend".

Some of the prominent Sikh shrines established by the Sikh gurus are:
 Nankana Sahib, established in the 1490s by first Sikh Guru, Guru Nanak Dev, Punjab, Pakistan.
 Sultanpur Lodhi, established in 1499 became the Sikh centre during Guru Nanak Dev time Kapurthala District, Punjab (India).
 Kartarpur Sahib, established in 1521 by the first Sikh Guru, Guru Nanak Dev, near River Ravi, Narowal, Punjab, Pakistan.
 Khadur Sahib, established in 1539 by the second Sikh Guru, Guru Angad Dev ji, near River Beas, Amritsar District, Punjab, India.
 Goindwal Sahib, established in 1552 by the third Sikh Guru, Guru Amar Das ji, near River Beas, Amritsar District Punjab, India.
 Sri Amritsar, established in 1577 By the fourth Sikh Guru, Guru Ram Das ji, District Amritsar, Punjab India.
 Tarn Taran Sahib, established in 1590 by the fifth Sikh Guru, [Guru Arjan Dev ji], District Tarn Taran Sahib, Punjab India.
 Kartarpur Sahib, established in 1594 by the fifth Sikh Guru, Guru Arjan Dev, near river Beas, Jalandhar District, Punjab India.
 Sri Hargobindpur, established by the fifth Sikh Guru, Guru Arjan Dev, near river Beas, Gurdaspur District, Punjab India.
 Kiratpur Sahib, established in 1627 by the sixth Sikh Guru, Guru Hargobind, near river Sutlej, Ropar District, Punjab, India.
 Anandpur Sahib, established in 1665 by the ninth Sikh Guru, Guru Tegh Bahadur, near river Sutlej, Punjab, India.
 Paonta Sahib, established in 1685 by the tenth Sikh Guru, Guru Gobind Singh, near river Yamuna, Himachal Pradesh India.

By the early 20th century, a number of Sikh gurdwaras in British India were under the control of the Udasi mahants (clergymen). The Gurdwara Reform Movement of the 1920s resulted in Shiromani Gurdwara Parbandhak Committee taking control of these gurdwaras.

Panj Takht
The  which literally means five seats or thrones of authority, are five gurdwaras which have a very special significance for the Sikh community. They are result of the historical growth of the religion of Sikhism and represent the centers of power of the religion.
 Akal Takht Sahib, (the Throne of the Timeless One) established by Guru Hargobind in 1609 is situated in the complex of The Golden Temple, Amritsar, India
 Takht Sri Kesgarh Sahib, located in Anandpur Sahib, Punjab, India
 Takht Sri Damdama Sahib, located in Bathinda, Punjab, India
 Takhat Sri Harimandir Patna Sahib, in the neighborhood of Patna Sahib, Patna, Bihar, India
 Takht Sri Hazur Sahib, located on banks of the River Godavari in Nanded, Maharashtra, India.

Description
The essential features of a gurdwara are these public spaces, the presence of the holy book and eternal Sikh guru the Granth Sahib, the pursuit of the Sikh Rehat Maryada (the Sikh code of conduct and convention), and the provision of daily services:
  :  singing hymns from the Granth Sahib. Strictly speaking only Shabads from Guru Granth Sahib, Dasam Granth, and the compositions of Bhai Gurdas and Bhai Nand Lal, can be performed within a gurdwara.
 : religious discourse and reading of Gurbani from the Guru Granth Sahib, with its explanations.
  and : providing a free community kitchen called a langar for all visitors, regardless of   cultural,  religious, regional, caste, or class affiliations.

Other ceremonies performed there include the Sikh marriage ceremony, ; some of the rites of the death ceremony, ; and most of the important Sikh Festivals. The , a Sikh processional singing of holy hymns throughout a community, begin and conclude at a gurdwara.

Gurdwaras around the world may also serve the Sikh community in other ways, including acting as libraries of Sikh literature and schools to teach children Gurmukhi, housing the Sikh scriptures, and organizing charitable work in the wider community on behalf of Sikhs. Many historical gurdwaras associated with the lives of the Sikh Gurus have a sarovar (eco-friendly pool) attached for bathing.

Gurdwaras have no idols or statues.

Customs

Many gurdwaras are designed to seat men on one side and women on the other, although designs vary, and the divided seating is far from mandatory. They do not generally sit together but on separate sides of the room, both at an equal distance from the Guru Granth Sahib, as a sign of equality.

In the  room, food is cooked and served by the volunteers in the community. Only lacto-vegetarian food is served in the langar hall, to suit the visitors from different backgrounds so that no person may be offended. All people belonging to different faiths sit together to share a common meal, regardless of any dietary restrictions.

Architecture

Gurdwara buildings do not have to conform to any set architectural design. The only established requirements are: the installation of the Granth Sahib under a canopy or in a canopied seat, usually on a platform higher than the specific floor on which the devotees sit, and a tall Sikh pennant flag atop the building.

In the 21st century, more and more gurdwaras (especially within India) have been following the Harimandir Sahib pattern, a synthesis of Indo-Islamic and Sikh architecture. Most of them have square halls, stand on a higher plinth, have entrances on all four sides, and have square or octagonal domed sanctums usually in the middle. During recent decades, to meet the requirements of larger gatherings, bigger and better ventilated assembly halls, with the sanctum at one end, have become accepted style. The location of the sanctum, more often than not, is such as to allow space for circumambulation. Sometimes, to augment the space, verandahs are built to skirt the hall. A popular model for the dome is the ribbed lotus, topped by an ornamental pinnacle. Arched copings, kiosks and solid domelets are used for exterior decorations.

Spiritual significance

Meditating by the Guru Granth Sahib

It is the duty of all Sikhs to engage in personal and communal meditation,  and the study of the holy scriptures. Meditating and understanding the meaning of texts from the Granth Sahib is important for the proper moral and spiritual development of a Sikh. One must study Gurmukhi script and be able to read Gurbani to understand the meaning of the text. A Sikh has to revert to the Granth Sahib for the all spiritual guidance in one's life.

Holy congregation (Sadh Sangat) and reflecting on Gurbani

It is believed that a Sikh is more easily and deeply engrossed by Gurbani when engaged in congregation gatherings. For this reason, it is necessary for a Sikh to visit gurdwara. On joining the holy congregation, Sikhs should take part and obtain the benefit from the combined study of the holy scriptures. No one is to be barred from entering a gurdwara regardless of their religious or regional background and are welcomed in.

Voluntary service (Seva)

Seva is an important and prominent part of the Sikh religion. Dasvand forms a central part of Sikh belief (of Vand Chhako) and literally means donating ten percent of one's harvest, both financial and in the form of time and service such as seva to the gurdwara and anywhere where help is needed. All Sikhs therefore get involved in this communal service whenever an opportunity arises.  This in its simple forms can be: sweeping and washing the floors of the gurdwara, serving water and food (Langar) to or fanning the congregation, offering provisions or preparing food and doing other 'house keeping' duties.

Community life and other matters

Sikhism offers strong support for a healthy communal life, and a Sikh must undertake to support all worthy projects which would benefit the larger community and promote Sikh principles. Importance is given to Inter-faith dialogue, support for the poor and weak; better community understanding and co-operation.

Learning and other facilities
Many gurdwaras also have other facilities for Sikhs to learn more about their religion, such as libraries, complexes for courses in Gurmukhi, Sikhism and Sikh scriptures, meeting rooms, and room-and-board accommodation for those who need it. Gurdwaras are open to all people, regardless of gender, age, sexuality or religion, and are generally open all hours of a day. Some gurdwaras also provide temporary accommodations for visitors or devotees. The gurdwara also serves as a community centre and a guest house for travellers, occasionally a clinic, and a base for local charitable activities. Apart from morning and evening services, the gurdwaras hold special congregations to mark important anniversaries on the Sikh calendar. They become scenes of much éclat and festivity during celebrations in honour of the birth and death anniversaries of the Gurus and Vaisakhi.

See also
Panj Takht
List of gurdwaras
List of Sikh festivals
Nanak Shahi bricks
Sangat (Sikhism)

References

Bibliography

External links

All Historical Gurudwaras
Siliguri Gurudwara
World Gurudwaras

 
Sikh terminology
Sikh architecture
Sikh practices
Articles containing video clips